Clemens Fankhauser (born 2 September 1985 in Rum, Tyrol) is an Austrian former professional cyclist.

Major results

2003
 3rd Road race, National Junior Road Championships
2004
 9th Trofeo Alcide Degasperi
2006
 National Under-23 Road Championships
2nd Road race
3rd Time trial
2007
 1st Grand Prix Austria Alu Guss
 1st Stage 3 Grand Prix Guillaume Tell
 3rd Road race, National Under-23 Road Championships
 5th Overall Mainfranken-Tour
2010
 5th Raiffeisen Grand Prix
 6th Zagreb–Ljubljana
2012
 1st Tour of Vojvodina II
 7th Tour of Vojvodina I
2014
 1st  Overall An Post Rás
 2nd Overall Tour de Serbie
 2nd Overall Baltic Chain Tour
 6th Grand Prix Sarajevo
 6th Grand Prix Královéhradeckého kraje
 7th Gran Premio Industrie del Marmo
 9th Overall Flèche du Sud
2015
 1st  Overall Tour of Szeklerland
1st  Mountains classification
1st Stage 2
 5th Rund um Sebnitz
 6th Overall Oberösterreich Rundfahrt
 9th Overall Tour d'Azerbaïdjan
 10th Raiffeisen Grand Prix
2016
 1st  Overall An Post Rás
 2nd Time trial, National Road Championships
 5th Overall Tour de Serbie
 5th GP Adria Mobil
 9th GP Laguna
 9th Gran Premio Industrie del Marmo

References

External links

1985 births
Living people
Austrian male cyclists
People from Innsbruck-Land District
Rás Tailteann winners
Sportspeople from Tyrol (state)